Ramp is an unincorporated community in Summers County, West Virginia, United States, located northeast of Hinton.

History
A post office called Ramp was established in 1905, and remained in operation until it was discontinued in 1942. The community was named for the abundance of the ramp plant in the area.

References

Unincorporated communities in Summers County, West Virginia
Unincorporated communities in West Virginia